Success Hasn't Spoiled Me Yet is the sixth studio album by rock musician Rick Springfield, released by RCA Records in 1982. The album was certified platinum in the United States, and produced three top 40 singles: "Don't Talk to Strangers" (No. 2 for four weeks), "What Kind of Fool Am I" (No. 21, not the show tune of the same name) and "I Get Excited" (No. 32). "Don't Talk to Strangers" and "Calling All Girls" also received considerable album rock airplay, charting at No. 11 and No. 4 respectively.

Billboard said of the single "I Get Excited" that it "lacks the irresistible dynamics and killer hook of 'Don't Talk to Strangers'" and that it "rehashes the formulas of Springfield's past hits," such as "the guitar opening of 'Jessie's Girl.'"

The album's name is a play on the question Will Success Spoil Rock Hunter?, the name used for a 1955 play and a 1957 film that were mostly unrelated to each other.  As the follow-up to the breakout album Working Class Dog, the album features cover art with a return of Springfield's pet Bull Terrier dog, Ronnie, this time enjoying the fruits of success.

In an interview with Songfacts, Springfield explained that "Don't Talk to Strangers" was about his paranoia that his girlfriend was being unfaithful when he was away. The song melody is actually from the earlier recording called "Spanish Eyes", found on Rick's "Sound City Recordings" from 1978.  "Kristina" is a remake of the Bachman–Turner Overdrive song "Jamaica", using different lyrics.

Track listing
All songs written by Rick Springfield, except where noted.
 "Calling All Girls" – 3:26
 "I Get Excited" – 2:32
 "What Kind of Fool Am I" – 3:19
 "Kristina" (Springfield, Jim Vallance) – 3:01
 "Tonight" – 3:19
 "Black Is Black" (Tony Hayes, Michelle Grainger, Steve Wadey) – 2:52
 "Don't Talk to Strangers" – 2:59
 "How Do You Talk to Girls" – 3:17
 "Still Crazy for You" (Charles Sanford) – 3:56
 "The American Girl" – 3:09
 "Just One Kiss" (Tom Kelly, Billy Steinberg) – 3:14
 "April 24, 1981" – 1:33

Production
Produced by Keith Olsen
Engineered by Chris Minto at Goodnight LA
Assistant engineer: Kim Turner
Mastered by Greg Fulginiti at Artisan Sound Recorders

Personnel
Rick Springfield - lead vocals, acoustic & electric guitars, backing vocals
Tim Pierce - guitars
Charles Sandford - guitars
Gabriel Katona, Alan Pasqua - keyboards
Dennis Belfield - bass
Mike Baird - drums
Tommy Funderburk, Tom Kelly, Richard Page - backing vocals

Charts

Certifications

References

1982 albums
Rick Springfield albums
Albums produced by Keith Olsen
RCA Records albums